Dark Hero is a 1946 thriller by Peter Cheyney featuring a Chicago gangster involved in the gang wars of the 1930s, who during the Second World War finds himself in Nazi-occupied Norway and becomes a hero of the anti-Nazi resistance - by applying essentially the same skills which had made him a successful and feared gangster.

The book's nonlinear narrative shifts and jumps back and forth between pre-war Chicago, wartime Norway, the Nazi concentration camp where the protagonist ended after being captured by the Gestapo, and London in the immediate aftermath of the war - where he seeks to exact deadly revenge on those who betrayed him to the Nazis. Events and characters from the different periods - and in  particular, the different women in the protagonist's life - constantly interweave and influence each other in unexpected ways.

1946 British novels
British crime novels
Novels set during World War II
Novels set in Norway
Novels set in Chicago
William Collins, Sons books
Nonlinear narrative novels
Novels by Peter Cheyney